Chester Township is the name of some places in the U.S. state of Minnesota:
Chester Township, Polk County, Minnesota
Chester Township, Wabasha County, Minnesota

See also
Chester Township (disambiguation)
Minnesota township disambiguation pages